The 1985 Geneva Open was a men's tennis tournament played on outdoor clay courts that was part of the 1985 Nabisco Grand Prix. It was played at Geneva, Switzerland from 16 September through 23 September 1985. Third-seeded Tomáš Šmíd won the singles title.

Finals

Singles

 Tomáš Šmíd defeated  Mats Wilander 6–4, 6–4
 It was Šmíd's 6th title of the year and the 46th of his career.

Doubles

 Sergio Casal /  Emilio Sánchez defeated  Carlos Kirmayr /  Cássio Motta 6–4, 4–6, 7–5
 It was Casal's 3rd title of the year and the 3rd of his career. It was Sánchez's 2nd title of the year and the 2nd of his career.

References

External links
 ITF tournament edition details

 
20th century in Geneva